Ērika Gricienko (born 30 November 2002) is a Latvian footballer who plays as a defender for RFS and the Latvia national team.

International career
Gricienko made her debut for the Latvia national team on 30 November 2021, coming on as a substitute for Tatjana Baličeva against England.

References

2002 births
Living people
Women's association football defenders
Latvian women's footballers
Latvia women's international footballers
Rīgas FS players